The Nepal Sadbhavana Party (NSP) was a political party in Nepal that worked for rights of the Madhesi people and discriminated communities and groups of Nepal.

On 21 April 2017, the party merged with Tarai Madhes Loktantrik Party, Sadbhavana Party, Terai Madhes Sadbhawana Party, Madhesi Janaadhikar Forum (Republican) and Rastriya Madhesh Samajwadi Party to form Rastriya Janata Party Nepal.

History
The party was founded in 1985, as the Nepal Sadbhavana Council, by Gajendra Narayan Singh. In domestic affairs, it aimed at promoting the interests and citizenship of the Madhesi community of the Terai Region, favored the introduction of Maithili as the second national language, and supported the framework of a democratic socialist society. Within the bipolar framework of the Cold War, it worked for the establishment of a special relationship with India and China in the framework of nonalignment. Govinda Sah is central spokesperson of Nepal Sadbhawana Party.

Nepal Sadbhawana Parishad participated in the democratic movement in Nepal. After the People's Movement of 1990 against the monarchical Panchyati Regime, NSP participated in the multi-party system that was re-established in Nepal. In 1990, it transformed into NSP. NSP took part in several coalition governments in Nepal during the 1990s. At the last legislative elections before the King of Nepal took power, 3 May and 16 May 1999, the party won 3.2% of the popular vote and five out of 205  seats.

In July 2001, Singh reorganised the NSP central committee. Rajendra Mahato was appointed general secretary and Sarita Giri as Central Spokesperson Badri Prasad Mandal and Hridesh Tripathy, both members of parliament, were nominated vice-presidents. Mr. Gauri Shankar Mohpal was appointed as member of Central Committee who held position as Vice president earlier.

Gajendra Narayan Singh died on January 23, 2002. Badri Prasad Mandal was appointed acting party chairman after Singh's death.

Splits, 2003–2015 
At the 4th NSP general convention, held in Rajbiraj in March 2003, the party split into two. A group led by the widow of Singh, Anandi Devi Singh and Hridesh Tripathy broke away and formed the Nepal Sadbhavana Party (Anandidevi). The remaining group elected Badri Prasad Mandal as the new chairman of the party. The convention elected a Central Working Committee, consisting of Badri Prasad Mandal, Ramnarayan Yadav, Bisheswor Rajbanshi, Dilip Kumar Dhadewa, Bishwonath Singh Rajbanshi, Chandrakala Singh Kuswah, Manish Kumar Suman, Satyanarayan Yadav, Dipendra Kumar Chaudhary, Sitaram Mandal, Durga Chaudhary, Dr. Dambar Narayan Yadav, Rajkumar Gupta, Laxman Lal Karna, Amrita Agrahari and Devendra Mishra.

In 2007, Mandal was expelled from the party. Laxman Lal Karna became the new party chairman. In June 2007, NSP merged into NSP(A).

After the demise of Gajendra Narayan Singh the party came to be overshadowed by some of the other Madhesh based parties coming into existence, which affected the party's strength. Also because of some dissatisfaction among the Nepal Sadbhawana Party's leaders the party broke into several pieces resulting into formation of several “Sadbhawana Parties”. under Rajendra Mahato, Anil Kumar Jha, Sarita Giri, Bikash Tiwari and Shyam Sundar Gupta.

Merger and dissolution, 2015–2017 
In 2015, the Sanghiya Sadbhawna Party, led by Anil Kumar Jha, merged with the Nepal Sadbhawana Party. Anil Kumar Jha became the chair of the integrated party, while Sarita Giri became the vice chairperson and Rajeev Jha became the General Secretary. In early October 2015, Sarita Giri quit the Nepal Sadbhawana Party. Later Nepal Sadbhawana Party merged with another four smaller parties: Madhesh Rastra Jantantrik Party (Krantikari), Social Republican Party, Nepal Republican People's Party and Jantantrik Terai Madhesh Mukti Tigers. Other local political leaders from Madhesh, from different parties in Mahottari, Bara and Rupandehi, also joined NSP. Following unification the party celebrated its silver jubilee, and participated in relief distribution after the devastating earthquake in Nepal. NSP's 6th General Convention in Janakpur took place in April 2016.

Electoral performance

See also 

 People's Progressive Party

References

External links
 Info on the party from FES.

Political parties in Nepal
Ethnic political parties
Mithila
1985 establishments in Nepal
2017 disestablishments in Nepal